Sammy is an American adult animated sitcom that aired on NBC in 2000. Created by comedians David Spade and Drake Sather, the series only had a two-week run, from August 8 until August 15, 2000. The artstyle of the series is reminiscent to Klasky Csupo cartoons.

Premise
The show is an animated sitcom whose central characters are James "Jamie" Blake and his father Sammy, both of whom are voiced by David Spade. Within the show, the younger Blake is a successful actor who lives in Los Angeles with his two brothers. The show features plot lines in which the father attempts to reconcile with his three estranged sons. Spade said that the show took inspiration from his own estrangement from his father.

Broadcast
Citing low ratings, NBC withdrew the show after only two of its thirteen episodes aired.

In 2021, a crew member from Sammy sent the episodes to a fan who released the episodes periodically on his YouTube channel, with the final episode being released on December 31 of that year.

Critical reception
David Bianculli of the New York Daily News criticized the show for a lack of humor. He also thought that Spade voicing both of the lead characters was "distracting". A review in Variety was negative toward the show for similar reasons.

Cast
David Spade as Sammy Blake and James Blake
Harland Williams as Todd Blake
Bob Odenkirk as Gary Blake
Maura Tierney as Kathy Kelly
Andy Dick as Mark Jacobs
Julia Sweeney as Marie La Peer
Jeffrey Tambor as Steve La Peer
Olivia Hack as Lola Blake (episodes 3-13)
Janeane Garofalo as Emily Blake
Mila Kunis as Lola Blake (episode 2)
Pauly Shore as Nelson
David Cross as Craig Blake 
A. J. Benza as himself
Alyssa Milano as herself
David Duchovny as himself
Drew Hastings as Dr. Breman, Referee and Border Guard
Frank van Keeken as Theadeus
Mark Fite as Bartender and Doorman
Tony Plana as Kiosk Owner and El Capitan
Becky Thyre as Girl 1 and Microphone Girl
Candi Milo as Pilar and Mexican Woman
Rolando Molina as Barkeep, Mexican Guy, Deputy and Lieutenant
Sally Kellerman as Cleo
Nia Vardalos

Episodes

References

External links

2000 American television series debuts
2000 American television series endings
2000s American adult animated television series
2000s American sitcoms
American adult animated comedy television series
American animated sitcoms
English-language television shows
NBC original programming
Television series by Universal Television
Television series by Sony Pictures Television
Television series by Adelaide Productions
Animated television series about dysfunctional families